Carlo Federici (1778–1849) was an Italian playwright and lawyer. He was the son of Camillo Federici, an even more prolific playwright. Affected by ill-health in his later years, Camillo dictated many of his plays to his wife and children, including Carlo. Federici was born in Genoa and educated in law at the University of Padua. His 1814 play Il paggio di Leicester, based on Sophia Lee's 1785 historical novel The Recess, was an intermediate source for the libretto of Rossini's opera, Elisabetta, regina d'Inghilterra.

Works
Federici's dramatic works include: 
Il bianco mazzetto, Teatro San Luca, Venice, 1801
L'amor paterno e la legge, Teatro San Giovanni Grisostomo, Venice, 1801
Il duca di Ossona, Teatro San Giovanni Grisostomo, Venice, 1801 
Maria Stuardo regina di Scozia, Teatro San Giovanni Grisostomo, Venice, 1801
Le prigioni di Lamberga, Teatro San Giovanni Grisostomo, Venice, 1801
La sentinella, Teatro San Giovanni Grisostomo, Venice 1802
Il paggio di Leicester, Teatro del Fondo, Naples, 1813
Elisabetta regina di'Inghilterra, Teatro San Benedetto, Venice, 1820

Notes

References

1778 births
1849 deaths
19th-century Italian dramatists and playwrights
19th-century male writers